"Throw Your Love My Way" is a country music song written by Ernest Tubb and Loys Southerland, sung by Tubb, and released on the Decca label. In June 1950, it reached No. 3 on the country disc jockey chart. It spent 15 weeks on the charts and was the No. 12 record of 1950 both based on retail sales and juke box plays.

See also
 Billboard Top Country & Western Records of 1950

References

Ernest Tubb songs
1950 songs